Puerto Lempira Airport  is an airport serving Puerto Lempira in Gracias a Dios Department, Honduras. It handles regional air traffic for the city. It is also a hub for general aviation and the Honduran Air Force.

The airport is within Puerto Lempira, the capital city of the Gracias a Dios Department. It is the principal transportation link to the rest of Honduras, as there are no paved highways leading to the city. The airport and city are on the shore of the Caratasca Lagoon, which provides the town's main economy. The airport and the township suffered substantial damage in 1998, after Hurricane Mitch made landfall in the general area.

Airlines and destinations

The following airlines operate regular scheduled services to the airport:

Accidents and Incidents
 On 27 December 1979, a Douglas C-47 belonging to the Honduran Air Force crashed near the airport, killing the two crew and injuring several passengers. The plane was written off.

See also 
Transport in Honduras
List of airports in Honduras

References

External links
OpenStreetMap - Puerto Lempira
SkyVector - Puerto Lempira Airport

SAP Honduras
Aerolíneas Sosa
CMA Airlines
Lanhsa Airlines

Airports in Honduras